Brigadier Wilfrid Chapman FIE (16 May 1891 – 6 May 1955) was an engineer, soldier and botanist after whom Eucalyptus chapmaniana was named.

Early years
Born 16 May 1891 at Wandsworth, London, son of Frederick Chapman, a geologist's assistant, and his wife Helen Mary, née Dancer. In 1902 the family came to Australia where Frederick took up his appointment as paleontologist at the National Museum, Melbourne, and served as the first Australian Commonwealth Palaeontologist 1927–1935.

First World War
 Enlisted 7 June 1915 
 Egypt & France
 Commissioned 29 September 1917
 France
 Discharged 31 July 1919

Post war
 At the Collins Street Independent Church, Melbourne, on 13 December 1919 he married Marea Feori Anastasia Maniachi with Congregational forms.
Re-employed by the railway construction branch
University of Melbourne (B.C.E., 1923; M.C.E., 1925).
made his name as a pioneer in the use of electric arc welding for structural purposes
1931 Chapman joined E.M.F. Electric Co. Pty Ltd as engineer in charge of research and development

Second World War
Called up for part-time duty on 1 January 1940
lieutenant colonel, he commanded the 2nd/2nd Army Field Workshop which he took to Palestine
colonel, chief ordnance mechanical engineer at A.I.F. Headquarters
He made some important innovations in the design of mobile workshops and was mentioned in dispatches
In January 1943 he was made chief superintendent of design. Promoted temporary brigadier in August
In November 1945 he transferred to the Reserve of Officers as an honorary brigadier

Post war
1946 joined the Commonwealth Department of Transport as director of civil engineering in the railway standardisation division
From 1946 he had been vice-chairman of the Australian Standards Association
1949 Chapman was one of three distinguished engineers upon whom the University of Western Australia conferred a doctorate of engineering honoris causa – a distinction in which he took such pride that he thereafter styled himself Dr Chapman.

Death
6 May 1955 at Mount St Evin's hospital, Fitzroy; survived by his wife and son, Wilfrid Alexander Maniarchi Chapman.

References

1891 births
1955 deaths
Military personnel from London
People from Wandsworth
Australian brigadiers
20th-century Australian botanists
Australian paleontologists
English emigrants to Australia
Australian military personnel of World War I
20th-century Australian engineers
Australian Army personnel of World War II